State Road 580 (NM 580) is a  state highway in the US state of New Mexico. NM 580's western terminus is at NM 75 east-southeast of Dixon, and the eastern terminus is at County Route 69 (CR 69) at the intersection of CR 70.

Major intersections

See also

References

580
Transportation in Rio Arriba County, New Mexico